Lake Innes is a lake in the South Island of New Zealand.

The lake is part of the Aan River. It was named by surveyor John Hay after his colleague John Innes.

References

Lakes of Fiordland